Abbey Moor Stadium is a football and former greyhound racing stadium on Godney Road, Glastonbury, Somerset

Origins
The stadium was constructed south of the Green's Drove and Common Moor junction on the east side of the Godney Road in an area known as Common Moor.

Football
Glastonbury FC have played at the stadium since 1982.

Greyhound racing
Racing was held on Tuesday and Friday evenings. The circumference of the track was 410 metres with races held over 280, 475 and 700 metres. Main races included the Glastonbury Derby and Glastonbury St Leger. The greyhound racing was independent (not affiliated to the sports governing body the National Greyhound Racing Club) and was known as a flapping track which was the nickname given to independent tracks.

The racing finished in 2000 and the track was covered over in 2000 but made a re-appearance in October 2005 until March 2006 before the greyhound racing ended for good.

References

Defunct greyhound racing venues in the United Kingdom
Sports venues in Somerset
Glastonbury